Beata Agnieszka Kempa (née Płonka; born 11 February 1966, in Syców) is a Polish politician. She was elected to the Sejm on 25 September 2005, getting 5,378 votes in 3 Wrocław district on the Law and Justice list. From 2015 to 2017, Kempa served as Chief of the Chancellery of the Prime Minister.

On 4 November 2011 she, along with 15 other supporters of the dismissed PiS MEP Zbigniew Ziobro, left Law and Justice on ideological grounds to form a breakaway group, United Poland.
In December 2015 it gained media attention after sending a letter to the President of the Constitutional Tribunal, Andrzej Rzepliński, informing him that the publication of the judgment of 3 December 2015 on K 34/15 concerning the conformity with the Constitution of the Republic of Poland of certain provisions of the Act of 25 June 2015 About the Constitutional Court]. This was the first such case since the Constitutional Court's inception in 1986 [16]. A prosecutor of the District Prosecutor's Office in Warsaw  investigated the abuse of powers in connection with the publication of the judgment. It was redeemed in January 2016 in the absence of the crime (in the justification it was pointed out that the actions of the head of the Chancellery did not affect the publication of the judgment, as it was within the competence of the prime minister).

See also
 Members of Polish Sejm 2005-2007

References

External links
 Beata Kempa - parliamentary page - includes declarations of interest, voting record, and transcripts of speeches.

1966 births
Living people
People from Syców
Members of the Polish Sejm 2005–2007
Women members of the Sejm of the Republic of Poland
United Poland politicians
University of Wrocław alumni
21st-century Polish women politicians
Members of the Polish Sejm 2007–2011
Members of the Polish Sejm 2011–2015
MEPs for Poland 2019–2024